Jonathan Ruttens (born 24 August 1987 in Brussels) is a Belgian retired football goalkeeper, who last played for Heist in the Belgian Second Division. After not having his contract extended in 2013, Ruttens opted to quit his career as professional goalkeeper.

Previously, he played three matches for Westerlo in the Belgian Pro League and spent most of his career with OH Leuven in the Belgian Second Division.

References

1987 births
Living people
Belgian footballers
Belgian Pro League players
Challenger Pro League players
K.V.C. Westerlo players
Oud-Heverlee Leuven players
K.S.K. Heist players
Footballers from Brussels

Association football goalkeepers